The Seventy-eighth Texas Legislature met from January 14 to June 2, 2003 in regular session, and in three called sessions in 2003, and a fourth called session in 2004. All members of the House of Representatives and all members of the Senate (15 to two-year terms, 16 to four-year terms) were elected in the 2002 General Election.

Sessions
 78th Regular session: January 14, 2003 – June 2, 2003
 78th First called session: June 30, 2003 – July 28, 2003
To consider legislation relating to congressional redistricting. 
 78th Second called session: July 28, 2003 – August 26, 2003
To consider legislation relating to congressional redistricting. 
 78th Third called session: September 15, 2003 – October 12, 2003
To consider legislation relating to congressional redistricting.

To consider legislation relating to state fiscal management, including adjustments to certain school district fiscal matters made necessary by recent changes in state fiscal management; making related appropriations.

To consider legislation relating to the dates of certain elections, the procedures for canvassing the ballots for an election, and the counting of certain ballots voted by mail.

To consider legislation modifying the filing period and related election dates for the primary elections in Texas.

To consider legislation relating to the financing, construction, improvement, maintenance, and operation of toll facilities by the Texas Department of Transportation and the disposition of money generated by the driver responsibility program, fines imposed for certain traffic offenses, and certain fees collected by the Department of Public Safety of the State of Texas; making an appropriation.

To consider legislation relating to the reorganization of, efficiency in, and other reform measures applying to state government.

To consider legislation appropriating fees established by legislation from the 78th Regular Session of the Texas Legislature that remain unappropriated. This matter shall be strictly construed to only include fees that were established during that session of the legislature.

Legislation relating to making an appropriation for the purpose of returning to a fund outside of the state treasury cash that was transferred from the fund to the general revenue fund. 
 78th Fourth called session: April 20, 2004 – May 17, 2004
To consider legislation that provides for performance based incentives to schools that attain higher levels of achievement.

To consider legislation that provides a cap on the growth in the appraisal values of homesteads for property tax purposes.

To consider legislation that provides a cap that is indexed to population and inflation on all property tax revenues received by local governments.

To consider legislation that provides reform of the property tax appraisal process, including having elected officials approve certification rolls, and requiring mandatory sales price disclosure of real property.

To consider legislation that provides for modifications to the recapture provisions of the school finance system, including but not limited to a constitutional amendment that links residential and non-residential tax rates at a lower level than provided by current law, providing for local enrichment.

To consider legislation that creates an Educational Excellence Fund to provide incentive funding, funding to maintain and enhance equity, and greater funding to address the needs of students with limited English proficiency.

To consider legislation on education reforms and property tax reduction proposals that benefit the school children and property tax payers of Texas.

To consider legislation that provides for an increase in cigarette and tobacco product taxes and fees and dedicating the revenue derived from the increase to the Educational Excellence Fund and for school property tax relief for taxpayers.

To consider legislation and amendments to the constitution that authorize and allow the placement and licensing of video lottery terminals at licensed racetracks and certain Indian reservations, providing that the revenue derived from such activity is dedicated to the Educational Excellence Fund, providing that the racetracks and tribes sign a contract with the state.

To consider legislation that privatizes the collection of delinquent taxes.

To consider legislation that provides for a reasonable tax and fees on certain adult entertainment venues.

To consider legislation that provides for an acceleration in the collection of tax revenues.

To consider legislation that reduces fraud in the sale of automobiles.

To consider legislation that closes loopholes in the franchise tax and dedicates the revenue from closing the loopholes to the Educational Excellence Fund and for school property tax relief for taxpayers.

Party summary

Senate

House of Representatives

Officers

Senate
 Lieutenant Governor: David Dewhurst, Republican
 President Pro Tempore (regular session): Eddie Lucio, Jr., Democrat
 President Pro Tempore (1st–3rd called sessions): Jane Nelson, Republican
 President Pro Tempore (4th called session): Jeff Wentworth, Republican

House of Representatives
 Speaker of the House: Tom Craddick, Republican

Members
Members of the Seventy-eighth Texas Legislature at the beginning of the regular session, January 14, 2003:

Senate

House of Representatives

: In the 2002 General Election, Ron Clark won the District 62 seat but declined it, having received an appointment as a United States federal judge. Phillips was elected prior to the start of the regular session.

Membership Changes

Senate

  District 1: A special election was held on January 20, 2004. No candidate received a majority of the votes on that date, so the top two candidates faced each other in a runoff on February 17, 2004. Kevin Eltife received a majority of the vote and was sworn in on March 5, 2004.
  District 31: A special election was held on January 20, 2004. No candidate received a majority of the votes on that date, so the top two candidates faced each other in a runoff on February 17, 2004. Kel Seliger received a majority of the vote and was sworn in on March 2, 2004.

House of Representatives

 District 43: A special election was held on April 15, 2003. No candidate received a majority of the votes on that date, so the top two candidates faced each other in a runoff on May 6, 2003. Juan Manuel Escobar won the runoff and was sworn in 3 days later, on May 9, 2003.
  District 62: Representative Clark was elected in the 2002 General Election, but resigned before re-taking the oath of office for the Seventy-eighth Legislature. A special election was held on December 14, 2002. No candidate received a majority of the votes on that date, so the top two candidates faced each other in a runoff on January 7, 2002. Larry Phillips won the runoff and was sworn in at the opening of the regular session.

External links

78th Texas Legislature
2003 in Texas
2004 in Texas
2003 U.S. legislative sessions
2004 U.S. legislative sessions